Brian Garner Wybourne (5 March 1935 – 26 November 2003) was a New Zealand theoretical physicist known for his groundbreaking work on the energy levels of rare-earth ions and applications of Lie groups to the atomic f shell and by mathematicians for his work on group representation theory.

Born in Morrinsville in 1935, Wybourne attended Canterbury University College, graduating with an MSc with second-class honours in 1958 and a PhD in 1960.

After post-doctoral research positions at Johns Hopkins University and Argonne National Laboratory in the United States, Wybourne returned to the University of Canterbury in 1966 to take up a professorship in physics, at the age of 31. 

He was elected a Fellow of the Royal Society of New Zealand in 1970, and the same year he won the society's Hector Medal, the highest award in New Zealand science at that time. 

He served as the head of the physics department from December 1982 to November 1989.  In 1991 he was a visiting professor at the Nicholas Copernicus University in Toruń, Poland, and decided to remain there permanently. 

Wybourne was appointed to a professorship in the Nicholas Copernicus University Institute of Physics in 1993. In 2003 he received an award from the Polish Minister of Education for his outstanding contribution to science. A month later he unexpectedly died of a stroke. In his 13 years in Poland Wybourne published 80 scientific papers. 

Wybourne's time in Poland was chronicled in The Polish Odyssey of Brian G. Wybourne, written by his colleague at Nicholas Copernicus University, Jacek Karwowski.

References

External links
 Google Scholar

1935 births
2003 deaths
People from Morrinsville
University of Canterbury alumni
New Zealand physicists
Academic staff of the University of Canterbury
Fellows of the Royal Society of New Zealand
New Zealand emigrants to Poland
Academic staff of Nicolaus Copernicus University in Toruń
20th-century New Zealand scientists
Rare earth scientists